Kürschner is a German-language occupational surname literally meaning "furrier". It may refer to:

 Izidor "Dori" Kürschner (1885–1940), a Hungarian football (soccer) player and coach
 Joseph Kürschner (1853–1902), German author
 Eugen Kürschner (1890–1939), Hungarian film producer

See also 
 Kirschner

German-language surnames
Occupational surnames